4th Infantry may refer to:

2/4th Battalion (Australia)
4th Battalion (Australia)
4th Battalion, 3rd Infantry Regiment (United States)
4th Battalion, Royal Australian Regiment
4th Infantry Division (India)
4th Infantry Division (Poland)
4th Infantry Division (United Kingdom)
4th Infantry Division (United States)
4th Infantry Regiment (United States)
4th New Guinea Infantry Battalion
4th Single Infantry Battalion (Estonia)
The Loyal Edmonton Regiment (4th Battalion, Princess Patricia's Canadian Light Infantry)